Stefan Loth (28 May 1896 – 16 July 1936) was a Polish footballer. He played in one match for the Poland national football team in 1926.

References

External links
 

1896 births
1936 deaths
Polish footballers
Poland international footballers
Place of birth missing
Association footballers not categorized by position